Tomáš Galásek (born 15 January 1973) is a Czech former football player and current manager. He was a holding midfielder who was also strong as a centre-back.

Club career
Galásek started his career with Banik Ostrava in 1991, before moving to Willem II Tilburg in 1997. With Willem II, he reached an historic fifth place in Eredivisie, which meant UEFA Cup qualification for the first time in 30 years. Since then, he played four UEFA Cup matches. In 1998–99, Willem II exceeded the previous year's performance, finishing second in the league. For the first time in history, Willem II qualified for the UEFA Champions League. In that competition, Galásek played five matches for Willem II.

Galásek moved to Ajax in the summer of 2000. With Ajax, he won the national championship twice and the national cup once and played 26 times in the Champions League.

From 2006, he played for 1. FC Nürnberg in the Bundesliga, after signing a two-year deal with German club. On 15 August 2008, he returned to Banik Ostrava. On 19 December, he signed a contract with Borussia Mönchengladbach. In July 2009, he retired from professional football but made a comeback in the Bayernliga on 31 August 2009 when he signed for FSV Erlangen-Bruck.

International career
Galásek made his debut for the Czech Republic in 1995 and was part of the team that reached the semifinals of Euro 2004. He took part in the 2006 FIFA World Cup as captain of the Czech team.

In June 2008, after a loss to Turkey at UEFA Euro 2008, he left the national team and ended his international career. He made 69 appearances scoring once.

Managerial career
In the season of 2011–12, Galásek trained the U15 team in FSV Erlangen-Bruck, where his son played. The following year, he was the assistant manager of the Czech national team. In the 2013–14 season, he was assistant manager of 1. FC Schweinfurt 05. In the summer of 2015, he became the head coach of SpVgg SV Weiden.

Personal life
Galásek was born on 15 January 1973 in Frydek-Mistek to Czech parents. In 1994, he married his wife Sylvie. Together, they have two children Denisa (age 26) and Tom (age 21). Currently, he has settled with his family in the suburbs of Nuremberg, Germany.

Career statistics

Club

International

Honours
Ajax
 Eredivisie: 2001–02, 2003–04
 KNVB Cup: 2001–02, 2005–06
 Dutch Super Cup: 2002, 2005

1. FC Nürnberg
 DFB-Pokal: 2006–07

References

External links
 
 

1973 births
Living people
People from Frýdek-Místek
Association football midfielders
Czech footballers
FC Baník Ostrava players
Willem II (football club) players
AFC Ajax players
1. FC Nürnberg players
Borussia Mönchengladbach players
Czech First League players
Eredivisie players
Bundesliga players
Czech Republic under-21 international footballers
Czech Republic international footballers
UEFA Euro 2004 players
2006 FIFA World Cup players
UEFA Euro 2008 players
Czech expatriate footballers
Expatriate footballers in the Netherlands
Czech expatriate sportspeople in the Netherlands
Expatriate footballers in Germany
Czech expatriate sportspeople in Germany
Czech football managers
Czech expatriate football managers
FC Baník Ostrava managers
Sportspeople from the Moravian-Silesian Region